Prince Frederick of Hohenzollern-Sigmaringen (25 June 1843, in Schloss Inzigkofen, Inzigkofen, Hohenzollern-Sigmaringen – 2 December 1904, in Munich, Kingdom of Bavaria) was a member of the House of Hohenzollern-Sigmaringen and a Prussian General of the Cavalry. He fought with distinction in the Franco-Prussian War. Frederick was the fifth child and youngest son of Charles Anthony, Prince of Hohenzollern and his wife Princess Josephine of Baden.

Marriage
Frederick married Princess Louise of Thurn and Taxis, eldest child of Maximilian Anton Lamoral, Hereditary Prince of Thurn and Taxis and his wife Duchess Helene in Bavaria, on 21 June 1879 in Regensburg. Frederick and Louise did not have children.

Frederick was buried on 6 December 1904 at the Erlöserkirche in Kloster Hedingen, Sigmaringen.

Honours and awards
He received the following orders and decorations:

Ancestry

References

1843 births
1904 deaths
Princes of Hohenzollern-Sigmaringen
Generals of Cavalry (Prussia)
Recipients of the Iron Cross, 2nd class
Recipients of the Order of the Crown (Italy)
Recipients of the Order of St. George of the Fourth Degree
Grand Crosses of the Order of the Star of Romania
Grand Crosses of the Order of the Crown (Romania)
Sons of monarchs